Emmett Brown Keeler (born September 28, 1941) is an American mathematician who works as a senior mathematician at the RAND Corporation. He is also a professor at the UCLA Fielding School of Public Health and at the Pardee RAND Graduate School. An elected member of the National Academy of Medicine, he is known for his work on the RAND Health Insurance Experiment.

References

External links

1941 births
Living people
21st-century American mathematicians
20th-century American mathematicians
RAND Corporation people
UCLA School of Public Health faculty
Members of the National Academy of Medicine
Harvard University alumni